Racing for Time is a 2008 Lifetime television film starring Charles S. Dutton, and Elizabeth Peña. The movie is based on the accomplishment of real life coach and prison guard Sergeant Noel Chestnut (later promoted to lieutenant) and the Ventura Youth Correctional Facility's track team he started.  The real story took place in California in the 1990s when California's Youth Authority's correction's officer Noel Chesnut started a track team for female inmates throughout the Camarillo area facilities where many of the female offenders had been convicted of murder and robbery. Noel sacrificed a lot to encourage these girls and several of them went on to lead successful lives due to his program.

Plot
Cleveland "Stack" Stackhouse (Charles S. Dutton) is a guard with the Texas Correctional Youth Authority who witnesses the cycle of destructive choices and racial tensions among female teen offenders and decides to do something about it. He gathers African-American, Latina and Caucasian teens, and organizes a multi-racial track team behind the bars of the prison. Participation in Stack's track team not only breaks down the racial divides between the girls, but puts them on a path to turn their lives around.

See also
 Inspirational/motivational instructors/mentors portrayed in films

References

External links
 

Films directed by Charles S. Dutton
Films shot in New Orleans
Lifetime (TV network) films
American biographical drama films
2008 biographical drama films
Biographical films about educators
2008 drama films
2008 films
American drama television films
2000s American films